De Haan may refer to:

Windmills in the Netherlands
De Haan, Brouwershaven, a windmill in Zeeland
De Haan, De Heurne, Gelderland
De Haan, Franeker, a windmill in Friesland
De Haan, Leeuwarden, see windmill in Leeuwarden
Zwarte Haan, Sint Jacobiparochie, a windmill in Friesland
De Kemphaan, De Waal, a windmill in North Holland
't Haantje, Weesp, a windmill in North Holland
Het Haantje, Leeuwarden, a windmill in Leeuwarden

Other uses
De Haan, Belgium, a municipality in West Flanders
Volley De Haan, the local volleyball team
De Haan (surname), a common Dutch-language surname
De Haan's Bus & Coach, a South African bus manufacturer

See also 
Bierens de Haan (disambiguation)
Haan (surname)